

2012 Angola Men's Basketball Cup
The 2012 Men's Basketball Cup was contested by 13 teams and won by Primeiro de Agosto, thus defending its title. The 2-leg final was played on April 17 and 20.

Preliminary rounds

Semi-final

Final

2012 Angola Women's Basketball Cup
The 2012 Women's Basketball Cup was contested by four teams, with the 2-leg cup finals decided by playoff, with Interclube winning the title.

See also
 2012 Angola Basketball Super Cup
 2012 BAI Basket
 2012 Victorino Cunha Cup

References

Angola Basketball Cup seasons
Cup